Pazhanji Church, officially known as St. Mary's Orthodox Cathedral, Pazhanji or Pazhanji Cathedral, is a Malankara Orthodox Syrian Church situated at Pazhanji near Kunnamkulam in Thrissur District of Kerala, India. The Church is locally called " Pazhanji Palli " (In Malayalam : പഴഞ്ഞി പള്ളി ) "Palli" [similar to the Malayalam word for "Church"]. It is a part of the Malankara Orthodox Syrian Church.

Four frescoes which had long been hidden by whitewash, believed to be 250 years old, were discovered in 2018. They were being restored in 2018.

History
The church is said to have been constructed by believers who fled from Arthat and later settled and constructed the church. It is how the name Pazhanji (Malayalam meaning Old boat) came into being for the place. According to the church's website, the ancestors of today's members of the Pazhanji Church earlier belonged to the Kunnamkulam Arthat Church. The first chapel founded in Pazhanji was situated in the northern side of the present church, whereas the chapel founded in the southern side. Both chapels are dedicated to St. Mary. There is a cemetery near the church. On 13 September 2015, the Pazhanji Cathedral was declared as the second cathedral of the Kunnamkulam diocese, the first being St. Mary's Cathedral, Arthat.2021 august 27 7 metropolitans where concentrated in this church.

See also
 St. Mary's Orthodox Cathedral, Arthat
 Pazhanji

References 

Malankara Orthodox Syrian cathedrals
Churches in Thrissur district